Wolf Pond is a lake located north of Stillwater, New York. Fish species present in the lake are brook trout, brown bullhead, and sunfish. There is a trail leading to the lake from Cage Lake on the east shore. No motors are allowed on Wolf Pond.

References

Lakes of Herkimer County, New York